Carterocephalus silvicola, the northern chequered skipper, is a species of butterfly of the family Hesperiidae. It is found in northern Europe and northern and eastern Asia.

The butterfly flies from May to June depending on the location.

The larvae feed on various grasses.

References

Heteropterinae
Butterflies of Europe
Butterflies of Asia
Butterflies described in 1829